Gujian3  (古剑奇谭三 in Chinese, Swords of Legends 3) is an action role-playing game developed by Aurogon Info & Tech, a subsidiary of Wangyuan Shengtang. The third installment of the Gujian series, it was  released on December 14, 2018, on Microsoft Windows.

Synopsis and gameplay 
This game expands the world of Gujian based on the previous titles and features cultural elements from ancient China. The game's monsters were inspired by Chinese mythology, and many of the in-game locations are based on photographs and descriptions of historic sites. As the latest title of the Gujian series, it has a more free and smooth combat experience with its full real-time combat system.

The game was compared to the Final Fantasy series for its gameplay mechanisms and mythology.

Release and reception 
On August 20, 2018, a trailer and demo were released. Gujian3 was released December 14, 2018 on Microsoft Windows. A year later, a version of the game with English subtitles was released. In July 2020 it was announced that the game sold over 1.3 million copies.

References 

2018 video games
Gamebryo games
Role-playing video games
Swords of Legends
Video games based on Chinese mythology
Video games developed in China
Video games set in Imperial China
Windows games
Windows-only games
Single-player video games